Mi Eraz (Arabic: حلم, English: A Dream), is the third studio album, and first full-length Armenian album by Armenian-Lebanese singer and actress Maria Nalbandian. It was released on February 14, 2015.

Background 
Nalbandian released her debut Armenian single "Djane Djan" in 2013, in result, she continued releasing Armenian singles until she started recording a full-length album in 2014. The album was produced and written mainly by Armenian artists Ara Hovhannisyan, Arman Antonyan and Ruzanna Andreasyan. Nalbandian revealed that creating a full Armenian album was her biggest dream, which was the reason why her album was titled A Dream. Her previous record We Regeat Tany (2007), included an Armenian song called "Ourestoun". The song "Elek Hayer" (Rise Armenians) was inspired by the Armenian heritage, it calls on the people of Armenia to be enthusiastic, united, and reject any dispute.

Track listing

References 

Albums by Armenian artists
Albums by Lebanese artists
2015 albums